Tadeusz Mysłowski (born 7 May 1943 in Piotrków) is a Polish painter, printmaker, and photographer.

Individual exhibitions and activities
 New York City, Belgrade, Paris, Lisbon, Kraków, Lublin, Wroclaw.
 Louvre in Paris
 Museum of Modern Art in New York City
 Victoria and Albert Museum in London
 In 1995, in Warsaw, Tadeusz Mysłowski presented his exhibition Endless Columns.
 In 1999 together with Zbigniew Bargielskim Shirne realized – a multimedia installation at Majdanek in Lublin
 One of the exhibitions (at the Galerie Renos Xippas in Paris) in February 1996, has been used in the movie advertising company IBM.
 The work of Tadeusz Myslowski are in the National Museum in Warsaw.

External links
Kim jest założyciel Manufaktury potretowej w Lublinie?
 Artysta Tadeusz Mysłowski opowiada
 Tadeusz Mysłowski – życiorys
 Tadeusz Mysłowski – wciąż między Lublinem a Nowym Jorkiem

1943 births
20th-century Polish painters
20th-century Polish male artists
21st-century Polish painters
21st-century male artists
Living people
Polish male painters